Lucas Ariel Villarruel (born 13 November 1990) is an Argentine professional footballer who plays as a midfielder for L.D.U. Quito.

Career
Villarruel started his career in 2012 with Huracán. He made his debut on 5 March in an away win against Boca Unidos in Primera B Nacional, which was the first of seven appearances during 2011–12. In November 2012, Villarruel scored his first senior goal in a 0–4 win versus Almirante Brown. At the end of the 2014 Primera B Nacional season, after he had scored two goals in ninety-seven appearances, Huracán won promotion to the Argentine Primera División. On 30 June 2016, Olimpo signed Villarruel on loan for the 2016–17 campaign. After twenty-seven appearances in all competitions, his loan was renewed in July 2017.

He returned to Huracán on 16 May 2018, following a total of fifty appearances for Olimpo over two seasons for Olimpo. Villarruel joined Defensa y Justicia in the following July. After six matches in twelve months for Defensa, Villarruel left on loan in August 2019 to league counterparts Newell's Old Boys. He remained until the succeeding December, appearing twelve times for them; though just four were as a starter. January 2020 saw Villarruel head abroad for the first time, joining Ecuadorian Serie A club L.D.U. Quito on loan for one year. He made his debut in a three-goal Clásico Quiteño victory away to El Nacional on 28 February, with his first goal arriving on 3 October against Mushuc Runa.

Career statistics
.

Honours
Huracán
Copa Argentina: 2013–14
Supercopa Argentina: 2014

LDU Quito
Supercopa Ecuador: 2020, 2021

References

External links

1990 births
Living people
Argentine footballers
Argentine expatriate footballers
People from Ramos Mejía
Association football midfielders
Sportspeople from Buenos Aires Province
Primera Nacional players
Argentine Primera División players
Ecuadorian Serie A players
Club Atlético Huracán footballers
Olimpo footballers
Defensa y Justicia footballers
Newell's Old Boys footballers
L.D.U. Quito footballers
Argentine expatriate sportspeople in Ecuador
Expatriate footballers in Ecuador